Hoseynabad-e Rud Shur (also Romanized as Ḩoseynābād-e Rūd Shūr) is a village in Rigan Rural District, in the Central District of Rigan County, Kerman Province, Iran. At the 2006 census, its population was 141, in 30 families.

References 

Populated places in Rigan County